The Orang Laut language or Loncong, is one of the Malayic languages.  It is one of several native languages of Orang Laut ('Sea People') of the Bangka and Belitung islands in Indonesia, and may be two distinct languages.

Anderbeck (2012) considers there to be an Orang Laut genetic grouping of languages, which includes the Kedah, Riau, and Sekak subgroups. The Malayic language Duano is divergent, and does not form part of this group.

References

Further reading
Anderbeck, Karl. 2012. The Malayic-speaking; Orang Laut Dialects and directions for research. Wacana, 14(2): 265-312.
Blench, Roger. 2016. "The linguistic background to Southeast Asian sea nomadism". In Sea nomads of Southeast Asia: past and present. Bérénice Bellina, Roger M. Blench & Jean-Christophe Galipaud eds. Singapore: NUS Press.

Sources
 Moseley, Christopher and R. E. Asher, ed. Atlas of the Worlds Languages (New York: Routelage, 1994)

Languages of Indonesia

Malayic languages